The Wedding Trip (Swedish: Bröllopsresan) is a 1936 Swedish comedy film directed by Gustaf Molander and starring Håkan Westergren, Anne-Marie Brunius and Karin Swanström. It was shot at the Råsunda Studios in Stockholm and on location in Copenhagen and on the French Riviera. The film's sets were designed by the art director Arne Åkermark. It is based on the 1932 play  Da stimmt was nicht by Franz Arnold.

Synopsis
A businessman takes his daughter Astrid to Copenhagen to get married, and then plans a honeymoon trip for them to the French Riviera. However the count is unexpectedly called away to London by telegram.

Cast
 Håkan Westergren as 	Count Erik Lejonsköld
 Anne-Marie Brunius as 	Astrid Björkman
 Karin Swanström as 	Countess Julia Lejonsköld
 Erik 'Bullen' Berglund as Jonas Vilhelm Patrick Björkman
 Karin Albihn as 	Karin Ekberg
 Harry Roeck Hansen as Ekberg
 Ragnar Arvedson as Henty Berhard Gustavsson
 Torsten Winge as 	Hotel clerk
 Edvin Adolphson as Emanuelo Silvados
 Wiktor Andersson as 	Private Driver Larsson
 Charlie Almlöf as 	Frenchman at gas station 
 Karin Appelberg-Sandberg as 	Hotel guest with white hat
 Gösta Bodin as 	François 
 Nils Dahlgren as 	Man with news paper 
 Nils Ekstam as 	Hotel director 
 George Fant as 	Young man with news paper 
 Georg Fernqvist as 	Private Detective 
 Peggy Lindberg as 	Hair Dresser 
 Allan Linder as 	Bellboy 
 Walter Lindström as 	Private Driver Andersson 
 Nils Nordståhl as Employed at hotel 
 Olav Riégo as 	Holm 
 Stina Sorbon as Hotel Guest

References

Bibliography 
 Freiburg, Jeanne Ellen. Regulatory Bodies: Gendered Visions of the State in German and Swedish Cinema. University of Minnesota, 1994.

External links 
 

1936 films
Swedish comedy films
1936 comedy films
1930s Swedish-language films
Films directed by Gustaf Molander
Swedish black-and-white films
Films shot in France
Films set in France
Films shot in Copenhagen
Films set in Copenhagen
1930s Swedish films